is a Japanese video game composer and game designer. His major works are Secret of Mana, Trials of Mana, Soukaigi, and Koudelka, for which he also acted as producer and concept designer. He has composed music for seven other games, and worked as a concept designer in addition to composer for the unreleased MMORPG Chou Bukyo Taisen. He became interested in music at an early age, but earned a degree in Religious Studies, Philosophy, and Cultural Anthropology from Kansai University. He spent the next few years working first as a manga illustrator, then as a composer for anime series, before coming to work for Square in 1991.

After composing the soundtracks for his first three best-known works, he formed his own video game production company, Sacnoth, for which he was the president and CEO. After producing and composing Koudelka in 1999, he left to become a freelance composer. Since his departure he has formed his own record label, Norstrilia, through which he produces albums of his own compositions and collaborations with other artists, as well as his previous scores. His music has been performed in concerts such as the Symphonic Fantasies concerts in Cologne, Germany in September 2009, and selections of his works have been published as piano arrangements in sheet music books.

Biography

Early life
Kikuta was inspired as a child by music from movies. It was not until he got a synthesizer, however, that he began to feel his potential as a composer. Kikuta went on to earn an interdisciplinary degree in Religious Studies, Philosophy, and Cultural Anthropology from Kansai University, which he attended from 1981 to 1984. He never received any form of formal musical training, and instead taught himself by reading music theory books and listening to a wide variety of musical genres.

After graduating from Kansai, Kikuta worked first as a manga illustrator under the pseudonym and later as an anime composer. The manga he illustrated, including one titled Raven, were done under the pen name . As an anime composer, he worked on The Adventure of Robin Hood and The Legend of Snow White. In 1991, Kikuta was hired by Square (now Square Enix), as a composer. After being rejected by his first choice, Nihon Falcom, he applied to Square without expecting to be hired, as they had many applicants for the job and he had never played any of the company's games. At the interview, however, Nobuo Uematsu was attracted to their shared love of progressive rock, and he was chosen over 100 other applicants. He started off debugging Final Fantasy IV and creating sound effects for Romancing SaGa, as there were not enough game projects in development to open up new jobs for Square's new hires, but Kikuta was soon given game soundtracks to compose.

Career

During his seven years at Square, Kikuta composed the soundtracks to only three games: Secret of Mana and Trials of Mana for the Super Nintendo Entertainment System and Soukaigi for the PlayStation. Kikuta says that he was given complete freedom to compose the soundtracks, in that he was given no direction at all as to how to compose the music; he began working on the music before the design of the game was finalized. This freedom was helped by the fact that Uematsu ran the music group as a separate division in the company from the game developers. Kikuta was originally chosen for Secret of Mana after Kenji Ito, who had composed the first game in the Mana series, Final Fantasy Adventure, was forced to drop the project due to other demands, such as the soundtrack to Romancing SaGa. Rather than create MIDI versions of his compositions, like most game composers of that time did, and hand these over to the sound engineering department, Kikuta made his own samples that matched the hardware capabilities of the Super Nintendo. This way he would know exactly how the pieces would sound on the system's hardware instead of having to deal with audio hardware differences between the original composition and the Super Nintendo. Kikuta spent nearly 24 hours a day in his office working on the soundtrack, alternating between composing and editing. Secret of Mana led to an arranged album, Secret of Mana+, which is composed of a single 50-minute track made up of "experimental" sounds like waterfalls, bird calls, and cell phone sounds.

For Trials of Mana, Kikuta was assisted by a sound programmer, Hidenori Suzuki, which allowed him to compose over three times the amount of music he had created for Secret of Mana. The move to the PlayStation for Soukaigi allowed Kikuta to focus on creating live music for the soundtrack, rather than tweaking the synthesizer instruments to make the music files fit in the game cartridge as he had to for the Super Nintendo. He used the added audio processing power to expand his musical creativity, including pieces such as songs in unintelligible Thai and Malaysian by Japanese singers. The game itself, however, was not a success, and Kikuta decided that he wanted more direct control over the next project he worked on.

After Kikuta finished Soukaigi, he left Square and founded the video game development company Sacnoth, assuming the position of the president and CEO from 1998 to 1999. During this time, the company created Koudelka for the PlayStation; Kikuta was credited as the concept designer, game planner, scenario writer, producer and composer. His philosophy in designing video games is that the best projects have a limited number of people designing the overall experience and making key decisions. He tried to follow this philosophy in creating Koudelka, and tried to bring a sense of "obsessive passion" to the project, reading what he claims were over 100 books on British history and taking the design team on a trip to Wales to study the country. The game was released in December 1999 to poor reviews which criticized the game's combat system, though they praised the concept, art direction, and music. Kikuta left Sacnoth soon after; the company changed its name to Nautilus and went on to produce four more games including the Shadow Hearts series before folding in 2007.

In March 2001, Kikuta founded Norstrilia, named after the novel of the same name. The company serves as his private record label, and publishes his albums. For the next few years he worked as concept designer, game planner, and composer for Chou Bukyo Taisen, a Chinese MMORPG, the original design for which he proposed to Enix. Development of the game ceased in 2004 due to disagreements between Enix and the Chinese company that was to maintain the game while it was in progress and it was never released. He spent the next few years composing for video games only released in Japan, including the eroge visual novel Sora no Iro, Mizu no Iro and the MMORPG Concerto Gate. Beginning in 2010 he started working as a composer for projects with several artists, such as Soulcalibur V (2010) and Rise of Mana (2014), which continues to date; his first solo work since 2010 was Indivisible in 2019.

Kikuta released Lost Files, his first album of original music, in 2006. The album includes the demo tapes Kikuta submitted when first applying for the job of game composer at Square, using the sound source of the Nintendo Entertainment System. It was followed in August 2007 by his second original album, Alphabet Planet. He has also composed three other albums and two singles in conjunction with other singers or performers; these albums have been released through his Norstrilia label. He released a third original album in 2011, titled Tiara.

Legacy
A piece from Secret of Mana was performed by the Tokyo Symphony Orchestra for the third Orchestral Game Music Concert in 1993, while one from Trials of Mana was performed for the fifth event in 1996. His music from Secret of Mana was also performed at the fifth Symphonic Game Music Concert in 2007 at the Gewandhaus Leipzig, Germany. Music from Secret of Mana made up one fourth of the music in the Symphonic Fantasies concerts in Cologne in September 2009 which were produced by Thomas Böcker as a part of the Game Concerts series. In 2012, five more performances of Symphonic Fantasies were given in Tokyo, Stockholm, and again in Cologne, with an additional performance in 2016 in London with the London Symphony Orchestra conducted by Eckehard Stier.

Two compilation books of piano sheet music from the Mana series have been published as Seiken Densetsu Best Collection Piano Solo Sheet Music first and second editions; songs from Secret of Mana and Trials of Mana are featured in both. All songs in each book have been rewritten by Asako Niwa as beginning to intermediate level piano solos, though they are meant to sound as much like the originals as possible. Selections of remixes of Kikuta's work appear on Japanese remix albums, called dōjin, and on English remixing websites such as OverClocked ReMix. Kikuta has said that he enjoys listening to these works, mentioning OverClocked ReMix by name.

Musical style and influences
Kikuta finds composing music to be natural, "like breathing". He considers it to be his "vocation", and contrasts it with designing and creating video games, which he calls his "wish" and finds to be very difficult to do in comparison to composition. Kikuta does not worry about the style of music that he composes, considering it to only be a tool or method. As a result, his music is frequently composed of combinations of styles mixed together. He is inspired to create his music by things that he has seen, especially while traveling; he credits much of the musical imagery in Secret of Mana and Trials of Mana as being inspired by several islands in Fiji he has visited. Rather than trying to be a "pure artist" that creates art for art's sake, Kikuta says that his primary goal in composing is to entertain the listeners. He has not been influenced by other video game composers, though he claims to admire Hitoshi Sakimoto, whom he worked with at Square. He has named Pink Floyd as his single biggest musical influence, and guitarist Allan Holdsworth as the artist he would most like to collaborate with. Kikuta stated that his favorite song he composed was "ouverture" from Concerto Gate.

Games
All works listed below were solely composed by Kikuta unless otherwise noted.

References

External links
  
 
 

1962 births
Japanese composers
Japanese male composers
Japanese male musicians
Japanese video game designers
Living people
Kansai University alumni
Musicians from Aichi Prefecture
People from Aichi Prefecture
Square Enix people
Video game composers